Scarlett and Black were a pop duo from the UK, whose birth names were Robin Hild and Sue West. Robin Hild was previously the keyboard player for the Big Supreme; Sue West was a former backing vocalist for Doctor and the Medics.  They released a self-titled album on Virgin Records in 1987, which proved to be a minor success in the U.S., peaking at No. 107 on the Billboard Top 200 in 1988. The single "You Don't Know" was a hit record that same year, peaking at No. 20 on the Billboard Hot 100 and appearing on the Adult Contemporary (No. 13) and Dance (No. 32 Hot Dance/Club Play, No. 41 Hot Dance Singles) charts.

Unable to provide a viable follow-up, Scarlett & Black remain dubbed as one-hit wonders.

Discography

Albums
Scarlett & Black (1987) - U.S. #107

Singles
"You Don't Know" (1986)
"You Never Understand Me" (1987)
"You Don't Know (Remix)" (1987) - U.S. #20
"Dream Out Loud" (1988)
"Let Yourself Go-Go" (1988)
"World Without You / Let Yourself Go-Go" (with Belinda Carlisle) (1988)

In popular culture
"You Don't Know" is played in one of the Wyatt sisters' bedrooms in Parent Trap III (1989). It was also on the soundtrack for the movie Hiding Out (1987).

References

External links
Scarlett & Black Just Miss Gold

English pop music duos
Musical groups established in 1986
Musical groups disestablished in 1989
Male–female musical duos
Virgin Records artists